Esther Vergeer and Sharon Walraven defeated the defending champion Aniek van Koot and her partner Jiske Griffioen in the final, 6–0, 6–2 to win the women's doubles wheelchair tennis title at the 2011 Australian Open. It was their first step towards an eventual Grand Slam.

Florence Gravellier and van Koot were the reigning champions, but Gravellier did not participate.

Seeds
  Esther Vergeer /  Sharon Walraven (champions)
  Aniek van Koot /  Jiske Griffioen (final)

Draw

Finals

External links
 Main Draw

Wheelchair Women's Doubles
2011 Women's Doubles